Mauricio Antonio Montero Chinchilla  (born 19 October 1963 in Costa Rica) is a retired Costa Rican footballer.

Nicknamed El Chunche (The Thing), Montero is widely known for his humble origins, which molded his behavior and charisma. His colloquial lexicon includes phrases such as chollarse las nalgas ("bust your buttocks"), which he uses as his motto to denote effort.

Playing career

Club
Montero came through the youth ranks of Ramonense and debuted for the senior team in 1980. He moved to Alajuelense in 1987 and retired on 15 September 1998 after a game against Atlético Bucaramanga. During that match, Alajuelense retired his #20 jersey that he had used throughout his tenure with the club. Montero, however, did not exclusively use #20 during his Alajuelense tenure as he used #12 on occasion between 1990 and 1991, and #3 (belonging to fellow defender Hernán Fernando Sossa) at least once during the 1990–91 season—Montero himself mentioned that he did this out of need due to the actual #20 shirts not being readily available. He totalled 556 league games, 408 of them for Alajuelense.

The nickname El Chunche ('The thing') comes from his answer to what he would buy with a prize he had won. He answered 'Voy a comprarme un chunche' ('I will buy a thing') meaning he would like to buy a vehicle (Costa Ricans use the word "chunche" to refer to pretty much anything). He is one of the most charismatic soccer players in Costa Rica.

International
Nicknamed El Chunche, ('The Thing'), Montero made his debut for Costa Rica in 1985 and was part of the squad, that played in the 1990 FIFA World Cup held in Italy, and featured in all four games played. The defender collected 56 caps, scoring 3 goals He also represented his country at the 1991 and 1995 UNCAF Nations Cups as well as at the 1991 CONCACAF Gold Cup.

He played his final international on June 5, 1996 against Canada.

International goals
Scores and results list Costa Rica's goal tally first.

Managerial career
A few years after his retirement, Montero became assistant to manager Oscar Ramírez at Belén, then coach with Municipal Grecia in the second division. After two seasons there, he became assistant head coach in his beloved team, Alajuelense and gained the CONCACAF Champions' Cup in 2004 and the national tournament in 2005. He was the coach of Carmelita from 2007 to October 2008. He returned to Alajuelense to become the first coach assistant, again under Oscar Ramírez' management. He was dismissed in August 2013 and put in charge of the club's U-15 team.

He was a commentator for Canal 7 Teletica Deportes during the 2014 FIFA World Cup.

Personal life
Montero is married to Luxinia Ávila and they have three children.

Notes
 In Central American Spanish, the word chunche refers to an "object whose name is unknown or not willing to be mentioned".

References

External links
 

1963 births
Living people
People from Grecia (canton)
Association football defenders
Costa Rican footballers
Costa Rica international footballers
1990 FIFA World Cup players
1991 CONCACAF Gold Cup players
Liga FPD players
A.D. Ramonense players
L.D. Alajuelense footballers
Costa Rican football managers
Copa Centroamericana-winning players
Municipal Grecia managers